Soy Luna Live was the second concert tour by the cast of the popular Disney Channel television series Soy Luna, in support of the soundtracks Soy Luna (2016), Música en ti (2016) and La vida es un sueño (2017). The tour began on 24 March 2017 in Buenos Aires at Tecnopolis Arena.

Background 
The tour was confirmed by Karol Sevilla at Susana Giménez on 25 September 2016. For the first leg, the cast of Soy Luna performed on forty two shows across nineteen cities of Latin America, finishing on 13 May 2017 in Guayaquil. The European leg of the tour was confirmed towards the end of May 2017. This second leg is set to begin on 5 January 2018 in Barcelona, and will include forty-nine shows on thirty-seven European cities.

Set list

 "Intro"
 "Alas"
 "Siempre Juntos"
 "Prófugos"
 "La Vida es un Sueño"
 "Invisibles"
 "Sobre ruedas"
 "Siento"
 "Mírame a mí"
 "Eres"
 "Chicas así"
 "Valiente"
 "Linda"
 "Música en ti"
 "I'd Be Crazy"
 "A rodar mi vida"
 "Solo Para Ti"
 "Catch Me If You Can"
 "Qué más da"
 "Allá Voy"
 "Yo Quisiera"
 "Un destino"
 "Valiente"
 "Vuelo"
 "Alas"
 "Siempre Juntos"

Shows

References

Soy Luna
2017 concert tours
2018 concert tours